The Men's Roller Derby World Cup is an international tournament in the sport of men's roller derby. The first World Cup was held between 14–16 March 2014 in Birmingham, England. The event has since been held in Calgary, Alberta, Canada in July 2016, and Barcelona, Spain on April 5–8, 2018 The next tournament is to be hosted in St. Louis, Missouri, USA on 9–12 July 2020.

The tournament is endorsed by the Men's Roller Derby Association (MRDA), and is held under the rules of Flat Track Roller Derby developed by the Women's Flat Track Derby Association, as used for all MRDA bouts.

2014 World Cup

Participating countries 

Fifteen countries competed in the first tournament: Argentina, Australia, Belgium, Canada, England, Finland, France, Germany, Ireland, Japan, Netherlands, Scotland, Sweden, USA, and Wales.   Two other teams, including New Zealand, applied to enter and received invitations, but withdrew before the tournament started.

Derby News Network described Team USA as "...clearly the hot favourites to win the World Cup", but noted that the European teams had the most competitive experience, having competed in the two Battle of the Beasts tournaments.  Team USA beat Team England in the final by 260 points to 71.

Teams held tryouts during 2013 and could send a roster of up to twenty skaters.  The participating countries were:

Results

Semi-finals

Final

Final rankings (2014)
The final rankings released after the Men's Roller Derby World Cup 2014 are as follows:

2016 World Cup 

In 2015 The organisers of the Men's Roller Derby World Cup announced that the next World Cup would be held in July 2016, in Calgary, Alberta, Canada.

Final rankings (2016)
The final rankings released after the Men's Roller Derby World Cup 2016 are as follows:

2018 World Cup
24 nations took part in the 2018 MRDWC in Barcelona Spain, up by 4 teams from 2016.

Final rankings (2018)

References 

Men's roller derby
Recurring sporting events established in 2014
Roller derby competitions
Derby, Men's
Men
2014 establishments in England